Jacques Vaillant is a French singer born on 8 June 1952 in Strasbourg (Alsace, France).

Biography 

Jacques Vaillant is an interpreter of French-language pop songs.

When he was six years old, he overcame the ordeal of an accident that left him almost completely blind. 
As he became a soprano in his school's choir, in Still, France, he felt a revelation: he already dreamt about singing on-stage.

In 1968, he was a contestant in the French radio Europe 1's show, "Les numéro 1 de demain", ("Numbers 1 of tomorrow"), which was touring via Strasbourg. In 1970, aged 18, Jacques Vaillant travelled throughout France, hitch-hiking and living from salesman opportunities. He stopped a while in Montpellier, and then in Marseille. In this town, he met Charles Humel, a French blind pianist and composer. Now deceased, the latter had composed the famous song Les plaines du far-west for Yves Montand. Next year, Jacques Vaillant arrived in the City of Lights, Paris.

In 1975, a guitar in his hands, he sang in the Paris métro. Trocadéro, République, Montparnasse stations: he gathered bigger audiences as days went by.
The year 1980 marked the release of Jacques Vaillant's second 45 rpm record Pourquoi piétiner les fleurs, the starting point of his career: ten thousand copies sold within a few months only. During the 1980s, the title Slow pour Alvina was distributed in disc shops, with Carrère publishing. Broadcast on major French radios (such as Europe 1, NRJ, Radio Monte Carlo, Radio 7, Sud Radio), this title was a first-place hit for days in Belgium, Switzerland, Benelux and in French DOM-TOM territories.

Finally, on account of lack of commercial success, he went back to the Métro. In these underground corridors, he would sell 40,000 copies of his first vinyl album , produced in 1983.
Henceforth, he wrote poems and song texts, finding his inspiration in everyday life. After more ten years of silence, Jacques Vaillant produced his latest CD, Paris Nostalgie.

Discography 
 1980 : Pourquoi piétiner les fleurs (RCA Victor; 45 rpm record)
 1981 : Slow pour Alvina (Force Records / Carrère; 45 rpm record)
 1981 : Comme un pantin désuni (Force Records / Carrère; single)
 1982 : Le chanteur des rues (RCA Victor; 45 rpm record)
 1983 : First album 
 1986 : Petite Nana Blues (Polydor; single)
 1986 : Second album Plein Soleil
 2007 : Third album Paris Nostalgie

External links 
 Official site about Jacques Vaillant (available in French and English)
 Jacques Vaillant songs on WAT TV

1952 births
Blind musicians
Living people
French pop singers
French blind people